Agatha is a small genus of minute sea snails or marine gastropod mollusks within the subfamily Syrnolinae, which is a part of the family Pyramidellidae.

They have bilateral symmetry and only have endoderm and ectoderm tissues.

The species of this genus are ectoparasites on other invertebrates.

Distribution
 Marine

Species 
 † Agatha alexanderi (Marwick, 1929) 
 Agatha amabilis Nomura, 1936
 Agatha australis (Angas, 1871)
 Agatha brevis Yokoyama, 1922
 Agatha filia (Melvill, 1893)
 Agatha georgiana (Hutton, 1885)
 Agatha laevis (Angas, 1867)
 Agatha obesa Peñas & Rolán, 2016
 † Agatha otaioensis Laws, 1940 
 Agatha pacei (Dautzenberg & Fischer, 1906)
 † Agatha pittensis (Marwick, 1928) 
 Agatha placida Nomura, 1936
 Agatha vestalis Melvill, 1910
 Agatha virgo Weisbord, 1962
Species brought into synonymy
 Agatha angasi (Tryon, 1886): synonym of Syrnola angasi (Tryon, 1886)
 Agatha infrequens Nomura, 1937: synonym of Odostomia infrequens (Nomura, 1937)
 Agatha lepidula Habe, 1961: synonym of Tibersyrnola lepidula (Habe, 1961)
 Agatha simplex (Angas, 1871): synonym of Megastomia simplex (Angas, 1871)

References

 Spencer H.G., Willan R.C., Marshall B.A. & Murray T.J. (2011) Checklist of the Recent Mollusca Recorded from the New Zealand Exclusive Economic Zone

Pyramidellidae